IAI Festival (full title IAI Festival/Great American Music Hall/San Francisco) is a live album by multi-instrumentalist Jimmy Giuffre, saxophonist Lee Konitz, guitarist Bill Connors and pianist Paul Bley recorded in 1978 which was the final release on Bley's own Improvising Artists label.

Reception

AllMusic awarded the album 4 stars noting it is "just 37 minutes of music, but it is definitely worth hearing".

Track listing
 "Blues in the Closet" (Oscar Pettiford) - 5:12
 "The Sad Time" (Jimmy Giuffre, Lee Konitz) - 2:34
 "Spanish Flames" (Giuffre, Bill Connors) - 11:26 		
 "Enter, Ivory" (Giuffre, Paul Bley) - 11:07
 "From Then to Then" (Giuffre, Konitz) - 5:44

Personnel 
Jimmy Giuffre – tenor saxophone (tracks 1 & 5), bass flute (track 2), clarinet (track 3), soprano saxophone (track 4), flute (track 4)
Lee Konitz – alto saxophone (tracks 1, 2 & 5) 
Bill Connors – guitar (track 3)
Paul Bley – piano (track 4)

References 

1978 albums
Jimmy Giuffre live albums
Lee Konitz live albums
Improvising Artists Records live albums